Väkra is an uninhabited village in Saaremaa Parish, Saare County, Estonia, on the island of Saaremaa.

References

Villages in Saare County
Former villages